Calochortus eurycarpus (white mariposa lily) is a North American species of flowering plant in the lily family. It is native to the western United States: Montana, Idaho, eastern Oregon, western Wyoming, northeastern Nevada (Box Elder County) and southeastern Washington (Asotin County + Garfield County).

Calochortus eurycarpus is a bulb-forming perennial with straight stems up to 50 cm tall. Flowers are white or pale lavender (or rarely pink) with a conspicuous reddish-purple blotch on the inside of each petal.

References

External links 
Turner Photographics, Pacific Northwest Wildflowers, Liliaceae Calochortus eurycarpus Wing-Fruited Mariposa Lily color photos and range map
United States Department of Agriculture, National Forest Service, White Mariposa Lily (Calochortus eurycarpus)
Flora of Eastern Washington and Adjacent Idaho, Eastern Washington University, Calochortus eurycarpus

eurycarpus
Flora of the Western United States
Plants described in 1871
Taxa named by Sereno Watson
Flora without expected TNC conservation status